Cassaba is:

 an alternate spelling of the town of Kasaba, located in Turkey
 an alternate spelling of casaba, a fruit